The name Brog may refer to the following people:
David Brog, American writer and activist
Ehud Barak (born Ehud Brog), Israeli politician
BROG, acronym for the (We)blog Research on Genre project

See also